Michigan Proposal B, the Abortion Legalization to 20 Weeks Initiative, was on the ballot in Michigan as an indirect initiated state statute on November 7, 1972. The ballot measure was defeated with 60.65% of the vote. However, the U.S. Supreme Court would overturn Michigan's abortion ban in the Roe v. Wade ruling one year later.

Contents
The ballot title for Proposal B was as follows:

Support
The Michigan Abortion Referendum Committee led the campaign in support of the ballot measure. The Michigan Coordinating Committee for Abortion Law Reform (MCCARL) formed the committee to lead the petition drive and campaign. The ballot initiative was also supported by Michigan Governor William Milliken (R).

Opposition
The Voice of the Unborn Coalition led the campaign in opposition to the ballot measure. People Taking Action Against Abortion (PTAAA) and Grand Rapids Right to Life formed the coalition to lead the campaign. Detroit mayor Roman Gribbs (D) also opposed the measure, stating that "We’ve lost sight of the consequences. We’re dealing with human meanings. We’re dealing with life."

Results by county
Here are the results of Proposal B by county. Red represents counties won by No. Blue represents counties won by Yes.

References

External links
 Ballotpedia - Michigan Ballot Measures